Ben Clark (born 1979) of Clarksville, Tennessee, is a mountaineer and commercial filmmaker. Clark is married to Mary Anne Potts and has a son, Charlie Clark and a daughter, Scarlett Clark. Most of his family members live in Clarksville, Tennessee including his mother and father, Anne and Jerry Clark, Jonathan Clark, his brother, and his two nieces Maggie and Molly Clark. Ben started rock climbing in his late teens and progressed to larger, more challenging mountains in his early 20s, eventually spending a decade pioneering alpine and ski mountaineering routes in the Nepali and Tibetan Himalayas. On May 22, 2003, at the age of 23, Ben became the second-youngest American to summit Mount Everest, via the North-Northeast Ridge Route, and also launched a film career.

Clark's 2003 expedition to Mount Everest was captured by filmmaker and friend, Jon Miller, and made into a documentary written and directed by Ben Clark and titled, "Everest: The Other Side." The film premiered on Dish Network Pay-Per-View in May 2005. Additional footage that did not make it into the final product was released in a series of video podcasts, entitled "The Rest of Everest." "The Rest of Everest" received positive reviews from critics and viewers alike. Within Apple Computer's iTunes Store, the video podcast garnered comments including "the best and most complete documentary on Everest," "totally fascinating" and "the jewel of web content creation for 2006." That December, iTunes editors declared "The Rest of Everest" as a "Best of 2006" podcast, beginning a run of nominations and awards that lasted four years.

Following the ascent of Everest and premiere of "Everest: The Other Side," Clark moved to Telluride, Colorado, where he became the host of Plum TV's "Fresh Tracks" and after a three-year stint in print, committed to a career in producing and filming documentaries about adventure and travel. Clark also continued to pioneer new routes in the Nepali Himalayas until May 2012. After skiing the first-ever tracks on Nepal's 21,600' Chulu West with a team of five, he retired from high-altitude first ascents and ski descents. His son, Charlie Clark, was born that September.

Clark continued to pursue his career as a filmmaker without the risk of high mountains and only in 2016 returned to the Himalayas to run. Clark has completed an unreleased as of yet film titled "The Snowman Trek," chronicling his 2016 expedition to Bhutan's Snowman Trek and setting a speed record around it.

References 
The Rest of Everest Site
bclarkmtn.com
Colorado’s Burliest Backyard Mountain Adventure Tests What’s Humanly Possible
Chasing a Speed Record on One of the World’s Highest, Hardest Treks
Why Bhutan Is the Toughest Place in the World To Set a Himalayan Speed Record

 American mountain climbers
1979 births
 Living people
 American summiters of Mount Everest